Scientific writing is writing for science. English-language scientific writing originated in the 14th century, with the language later becoming the dominant medium for the field. Style conventions for scientific writing vary, with different focuses by different style guides on the use of passive versus active voice, personal pronoun use, and article sectioning. Much scientific writing is focused around scientific reports, traditionally structured as an abstract, introduction, methods, results, conclusions, and acknowledgments.

History

Scientific writing in English started in the 14th century. With the founding in 1665 of the first scientific journal in English, the Philosophical Transactions of the Royal Society, the features of scientific writing gradually evolved from republication of personal letters to freestanding articles, with greater specificity of methods and findings, as well as conclusions to be drawn from evidence. Modern practices of intertextual reference and citation emerged only at the end of the eighteenth century.

The Royal Society established good practice for scientific writing. Founder member Thomas Sprat wrote on the importance of plain and accurate description rather than rhetorical flourishes in his History of the Royal Society of London. Robert Boyle emphasized the importance of not boring the reader with a dull, flat style.

Because most scientific journals accept manuscripts only in English, an entire industry has developed to help non-native English speaking authors improve their text before submission. It is just now becoming an accepted practice to utilize the benefits of these services. This is making it easier for scientists to focus on their research and still get published in top journals.

Besides the customary readability tests, software tools relying on Natural Language Processing to analyze text help writer scientists evaluate the quality of their manuscripts prior to submission to a journal. SWAN, a Java app written by researchers from the University of Eastern Finland is such a tool.

Writing style guides
Publication of research results is the global measure used by all disciplines to gauge a scientist's level of success.

Different fields have different conventions for writing style, and individual journals within a field usually have their own style guides. Some issues of scientific writing style include:
 Dissuasion from, and sometimes advocacy of, the passive voice. Advocates for the passive voice argue for its utility in avoiding first-person pronouns, while critics argue that it can be hard to make claims without active voice.
Generalizations about tense. In the mathematical sciences, for example, it is customary to report in the present tense, while in experimental sciences reporting is always in the past tense, as the experiments happened in the past.
 Preferences about "we" vs. "I" as personal pronoun or a first-person pronoun (e.g., mathematical deductions sometimes include the reader in the pronoun "we.")

Contemporary researchers in writing studies have pointed out that blanket generalizations about academic writing are seldom helpful, for example, scientific writing in practice is  complex and shifts of tense and person reflect subtle changes in the section of the scientific journal article. Additionally, the use of passive voice allows the writer to focus on the subject being studied (the focus of the communication in science) rather than the author. Similarly, some use of first-person pronouns is acceptable (such as "we" or "I," which depends on the number of authors). According to some journal editors, the best practice to review articles recently published in the journal a researcher is planning to submit to.

Nobel Prize-winning chemist Roald Hoffmann has stated that, in the chemical sciences, drawing chemistry is as fundamental as writing chemistry.

Scientific report 
The stages of the scientific method are often incorporated into sections of scientific reports. The first section is typically the abstract, followed by the introduction, methods, results, conclusions, and acknowledgments. The introduction discusses the issue studied and discloses the hypothesis tested in the experiment. The step-by-step procedure, notable observations, and relevant data collected are all included in methods and results. The discussion section consists of the author's analysis and interpretations of the data. Additionally, the author may choose to discuss any discrepancies with the experiment that could have altered the results. The conclusion summarizes the experiment and will make inferences about the outcomes. The paper will typically end with an acknowledgments section, giving proper attribution to any other contributors besides the main author(s). In order to get published, papers must go through peer review by experts with significant knowledge in the field. During this process, papers may get rejected or edited with adequate justification.

This historically emerged form of argument has been periodically criticized for obscuring the process or investigation, eliminating the incorrect guesses, false leads, and errors that may have occurred before coming to the final method, data, explanation, and argument presented in the published paper. This lack of transparency was criticized by Joseph Priestley as early as 1767 as mystifying the research process and more recently for similar reasons by Nobel Laureate Peter Medawar in a BBC talk in 1964.

See also 

 Academic publishing
 Academic writing
 Citation
 Common English usage misconceptions
 EASE Guidelines for Authors and Translators of Scientific Articles
 Fast abstract
 GLISC
 Impact factor
 IMRAD structure (Introduction, Method, Result and Discussion)
 A Manual for Writers of Research Papers, Theses, and Dissertations, authored by Kate L. Turabian (The Chicago Manual of Style)
 Medical writing
 Parenthetical referencing
 Peer review
 Research paper mill
 Scientific article
 Scientific journal
 Scientific literature
 Scientific method
 Science journalism
 Technical writing

References

Writings by topic